The 1949 Caribbean Series was the first edition of the Caribbean Series (Serie del Caribe). It was held from February 20 through February 25 with the champion baseball teams of Cuba, Alacranes del Almendares; Panama, Spur Cola  Colonites; Puerto Rico, Indios de Mayagüez and Venezuela, Cervecería Caracas. 

The format consisted of 12 games, each team facing the other teams twice, and the games were played at the Del Cerro Stadium in Havana, Cuba, which boosted capacity to 35.000 seats. The first pitch was thrown by George Trautman, by then the president of the National Association of Professional Baseball Leagues.

Summary
Cuba captured the competition with an undefeated record of 6-0, behind a strong pitching effort by Agapito Mayor, who posted a 3-0 record (2 as a starter, 1 in relief) and won Most Valuable Player honors. His three wins in the CBWS still a series record. 

The offensive support came from Monte Irvin, who hit .389 and led the hitters with two home runs and 11 RBI; Al Gionfriddo, the champion bat with a .533 average (8-for-15); Chuck Connors, who  hit .409 with five runs and five RBI, and Sam Jethroe, a .320 hitter with three triples, six runs, and five RBI. Cuba, managed by Fermín Guerra, also collected a 4–0 shutout by Ed Wright (the first in Series history) and complete game wins from René Solís and Conrado Marrero. Other roster members were Santos Amaro,  Andrés Fleitas and René González.

Venezuela, managed by José Antonio Casanova, ended second with a 3-3 mark. José Bracho led the pitching staff with a 2-0 record and a 3.21 ERA in 14 innings. He also contributed to his own cause by going 5-for-6 (.833) with a double and two RBI. Luis Zuloaga won a complete-game pitching duel against Puerto Rico's Alonzo Perry for the other Venezuelan victory. The offense was paced by catcher Guillermo Vento (.375) and first baseman Dalmiro Finol (.333), who also hit the first home run in Series history. Veteran slugger Vidal López reinforced the team, going 1-for-2 in a pitch-hitting role. 

Panama finished third with a 2-4 record. The team, managed by catcher León Kellman, had a solid pitching staff that included Sam Jones and Pat Scantlebury, but was victim of a low-run support. Lester Lockett  went 9-for-22 with two doubles, while leading the team in both average (.409) and runs scored (six). Kellman batted only .238, but stole four bases to tie teammate Sam Bankhead and Cuba's Chuck Connors for the Series lead. 

Puerto Rico ended in fourth place with a 1-5 record. The team was led by shortstop-manager Artie Wilson (.346, three stolen bases), Quincy Trouppe (.444), Luke Easter (.400, 7 RBI), and specially Wilmer Fields, who hit the first grand slam in Series history and drove in seven runs.

Participating teams

Final standings

Scoreboards

Game 1, February 20

Game 2, February 20

Game 3, February 21

Game 4, February 21

Game 5, February 22

Game 6, February 21

Game 7, February 23

Game 8, February 23

Game 9, February 24

Game 10, February 24

Game 11, February 25

Game 12, February 25

Statistics leaders

Awards

See also
Ballplayers who have played in the Series

References

Sources
Antero Núñez, José. Series del Caribe. Jefferson, Caracas, Venezuela: Impresos Urbina, C.A., 1987.
Gutiérrez, Daniel. Enciclopedia del Béisbol en Venezuela – 1895-2006 . Caracas, Venezuela: Impresión Arte, C.A., 2007.

External links
Official site
Latino Baseball
Series del Caribe, Las (Spanish)
 

Caribbean
Caribbean Series
International baseball competitions hosted by Cuba
Baseball competitions in Havana
Caribbean Series
20th century in Havana
Caribbean Series